Vinje or Nedre Vinjo is a village in Voss municipality in Vestland county, Norway.  The village is located at the confluence of two small rivers flowing out of the lakes Myrkdalsvatnet (to the northwest) and Oppheimsvatnet (to the east).  The village also sits at the junction of Norwegian National Road 13 and the European route E16 highway.  Vinje Church is located in the village, and there has been a church here since the middle ages.

References

Villages in Vestland
Voss